Violette Huck (born 18 March 1988 in Pessac, France) is a French tennis player.

She has a career high singles ranking of no. 213, achieved in December 2007. Her ranking as of March 2009 is no. 158. In 2009, she won an ITF $25 000 event doubles title.

Career
Violette has a career win–loss record of 109–105 on the ITF women's circuit and has won one title. She missed out on qualifying for the 2008 Australian Open as she lost to the Russian player Anastasia Pavlyuchenkova, 6–3, 3–6, 6–1. She was awarded a wild-card for the 2008 French Open at Roland Garros as a French player.

ITF Career Finals

Singles: 4 (3–1)

Doubles: 9 (2–7)

External links

1988 births
Living people
French female tennis players
Sportspeople from Gironde